Brosmophyciops pautzkei, the slimy cuskeel or free-tailed reef brotula, is a species of viviparous brotulas found in tropical reefs of the Indian and Pacific Oceans.  This species grows to  total length.  This species is the only known member of its genus. The specific name honours Clarence F. Pautzke, who was a former student of the describer of this species who went on to become the chief biologist in the Department of Game of Washington state and who was present on Bikini Atoll in 1946 and 1947 when the type specimen was collected.

References 

Bythitidae
Monotypic fish genera
Fish described in 1960
Taxa named by Leonard Peter Schultz